Victor Denis (12 January 1889 – 3 March 1972) was a French professional footballer who played as a midfielder. He made one appearance for the France national team in 1908. Denis's only match for France was a 4–1 friendly defeat to the Netherlands on 10 May 1908.

References

External links
 

1889 births
1972 deaths
French footballers
France international footballers
Sportspeople from Nord (French department)
Association football midfielders
US Tourcoing FC players
Footballers from Hauts-de-France